Krasnodar Higher Military School named for Army General S.M. Shtemenko is Russian military academy conducting warrant officer programmes, commissioned officer programmes (specialitet), advance training career commissioned officer programmes (magistratura), and adjunctura programmes. It is located in Krasnodar.

History
The School was founded in 1929 as advanced training courses for command personnel. In 1954, courses were transformed into Military School and relocated to Krasnodar. Since 1969, it was called Krasnodar Higher Military Red Banner School. In 1977, the School was given the name of Army General Sergei Shtemenko. In 1998, the School was transformed into Krasnodar Military Institute. It was given its current name in 2015.

Educational programmes
The Krasnodar Higher Military School named for Army General S.M. Shtemenko prepares information security officers for all military branches.

References

External links
 Official website

Military academies of Russia
Military academies of the Soviet Army
Military high schools